Able may refer to:

 Able (1920 automobile), a small French cyclecar
 Able (rocket stage), an upper stage for Vanguard, Atlas, and Thor rockets
 Able (surname)
 ABLE account, a savings plan for people with disabilities
 Able UK, British ship breaking and recycling company
 Able, Colorado, a community in the United States
 Association for Better Living and Education, a non-profit Church of Scientology organization
 Oklahoma Alcoholic Beverage Laws Enforcement Commission, a.k.a. Able Commission
 USNS Able (T-AGOS-20), a U.S. Navy oceanographic survey ship
 Able space probes, probes in the Pioneer program
 Able, a U.S. 1946 nuclear weapon test, part of Operation Crossroads
 Able, one of the first two monkeys in space to return to Earth alive
 The first letter of the Able-Baker spelling alphabet

See also
 Hurricane Able, three hurricanes in the early 1950s
Abel (disambiguation)
Ability (disambiguation)
Ables (disambiguation)